Arthur William Owen (23 March 1915 in Lambeth, London – 27 April 2002 in Vilamoura, Portugal) was a British racing driver from England.  He participated in one Formula One World Championship Grand Prix, the 1960 Italian Grand Prix, driving a privately entered 2.2-litre Cooper.  He crashed on the first lap of the race at the South Corner, due to brake failure. He retired with suspension damage and scored no championship points.

On 17 October 1955 Arthur Owen, Jim Russell and William Knight drove a 'bobtail' Cooper sports car at the Autodrome de Montlhéry to set thirteen international speed and distance records in Class G on this banked track. Owen went on to set further records at Monza in Italy.

On 5 September 1959, driving a Cooper-Climax, Owen made fastest time of the day at the Brighton Speed Trials. In 1962, Owen won the British Hill Climb Championship at the wheel of a Cooper-Climax T53, prepared by fellow-competitor Patsy Burt's PMB Garages team. Arthur Owen competed in the 1962 Macau Grand Prix in a Cooper single-seater, qualifying on pole position but crashing early in the race. He finished third in the first Japanese Grand Prix, held at Suzuka on 3 and 4 May 1963, driving a Lotus 23 sports car.

Complete Formula One World Championship results
(key)

References

Books

The Racing Coopers, by Arthur Owen, Cassell, 1959, 243 Pages.

English racing drivers
English Formula One drivers
British hillclimb drivers
Brighton Speed Trials people
1915 births
2002 deaths